Forest High School is a school in Ocala, Florida, United States. It has an EMIT (engineering) program. The school's colors are green and gold and the school mascot is the Wildcat. As of 2014, it had an enrollment of some 2,058.

Forest High School moved to its current location on Maricamp Road, southeast of the city limits of Ocala, in 2005. The school was originally on Fort King Street in Ocala, at the 1959 campus of Ocala High School. Prior to 1965, the school was for white students only. In 1965, a group of 34 students from the nearby black school, Howard High School began attending. In 1969 the courts mandated the schools became fully integrated and Howard was closed. Vanguard High School was opened the same year, and the Marion County School Board put to rest the name Ocala High School.

Forest High School belongs to the Marion County School District.

Programs

Engineering and Manufacturing Institute of Technology (EMIT) 

EMIT is a four-year magnet engineering program at Forest High School. EMIT aims to teach its students engineering fundamentals to prepare them for postsecondary colleges or universities in engineering.  The curriculum is heavily project-based that often includes problem-solving tasks which must be built and later presented to teachers.  These projects typically cover the basics of many engineering disciplines, including civil engineering, aerospace engineering, and more.

EMIT was created from a $1.2 million Florida Department of Education grant in 1994.  An application is required to be considered for admission.

Shooting 

On April 20, 2018, the 19th anniversary of the Columbine High School massacre, a 19-year-old former student went on school premises armed with a shotgun and wearing black tactical vest. The perpetrator, later identified as Sky Bouche, smuggled the gun into school in a guitar case. He shot once through a classroom door and hit one student in his ankle. Immediately after he surrendered to the school staff. In 2021 Bouche was sentenced to 30years imprisonment, with the possibility of parole only after 25years, followed by an additional 30years of probationary release.

Notable alumni
 Tony Beckham – football cornerback
 Scot Brantley –  linebacker in the National Football League (NFL) for the Tampa Buccaneers of the NFL
 C. Farris Bryant – Governor of Florida from 1961 to 1965 
 Judd Davis – football place-kicker
 Jonathan Johnson – Major League Baseball pitcher
 Mike Sullivan – professional golfer on the PGA Tour, Nationwide Tour, and the Champions Tour
 Mava Lee Thomas – All-American Girls Professional Baseball League player
 Rick Tuten – punter in the National Football League
 Tyrone Young – wide receiver in the National Football League
 Alex Shelnutt - drummer of American rock band A Day to Remember
 Reid Nichols - outfielder Boston Red Sox
 Erin Jackson - American Olympic speedskater

References

External links
 Forest High School Website

Buildings and structures in Ocala, Florida
High schools in Marion County, Florida
Educational institutions established in 1969
Public high schools in Florida
1969 establishments in Florida